Striking Point is an action film directed by Thomas H. Fenton and starring Christopher Mitchum, Ivan Rogers, Stan Morse, Mark Hanson, Tracy Spaulding, and Rocky Patterson. It is about detectives in their quest to stop the KGB from bringing in weapons for gangs in the United States.

Background
Even though the cold war is over, the KGB are shipping deadly weapons into the US and supplying street gangs with them, thus priming one of their own. It's up to the determined police detectives to stop them. The lead villain Romanov is played by Christopher Mitchum. The police officers, Captain Matthews and Detective Joe Morris are played by Ivan Rogers and Rocky Patterson.

The April 1, 1995 issue of Billboard recorded it as a new entry at 35 in the Top 40 video rentals.

Cast
 Christopher Mitchum  ... Col. Ivan Romanov 
 Tracy Spaulding  ... Tina Wells 
 Rocky Patterson  ... Det. Joe Morris 
 Jeff Blanchard  ... John Burke 
 Rob Flynn  ... Mikial 
 Mark Hanson   ... Vladimir 
 Stan Morse  ... Nick Harris 
 Ivan Rogers  ... Capt. Matthews 
 Jeremy Schwartz  ... Mickey 
 Patrick Swinnea  ... Konrad

References

External links
 

1995 films
1990s English-language films
American action films
1990s American films